Cyrtonyx is a bird genus in the New World quail family Odontophoridae.

The genus Cyrtonyx was introduced in 1844 by the English ornithologist and bird artist John Gould. The name combines the Ancient Greek kurtos meaning "curved" and onux meaning "nail" or "claw". The type species is the Montezuma quail (Cyrtonyx montezumae).

Species
The genus contains two species:

References

 
Bird genera
Taxonomy articles created by Polbot